The 1st Tournament for Bolesław Chrobry Crown - First King of Poland was the 2008 version of the Bolesław Chrobry Tournament. It took place on 29 June in the Start Gniezno Stadium in Gniezno, Poland. The Tournament was won by Rafał Dobrucki who beat Rafał Okoniewski and Sebastian Ułamek. The top Gniezno' rider Piotr Paluch was ninth.

Heat details 
 29 June 2008 (Saturday)
 Best Time: 65.18 - Rafał Dobrucki in Heat 9
 Attendance: 5,000
 Referee: Józef Komakowski (Bydgoszcz)

Heat after heat 
 (65,63) Jeleniewski, Paluch, Hlib, Stachyra
 (66,23) Dobrucki, Okoniewski, Drabik, Ząbik
 (66,32) Cieślewicz, Rempała, Kościuch, M. Jabłoński
 (65,62) Miedziński, K. Jabłoński, Drabik, Kościecha
 (65,67) Ułamek, K. Jabłoński, Kościuch, Paluch
 (65,29) Dobrucki, Kościecha, Cieślewicz, Jeleniewski
 (65,25) Drabik, Ząbik, M. Jabłoński, Stachyra
 (65,71) Okoniewski, Hlib, Miedziński, Rempała
 (65,18) Dobrucki, Miedziński, Paluch, M. Jabłoński
 (65,33) Ułamek, Jeleniewski, Drabik, Rempała
 (65,26) Okoniewski, Kościecha, Kościuch, Stachyra
 (66,02) K. Jabłoński, Ząbik, Hlib, Cieślewicz (E/st)
 (66,61) Paluch, Ząbik, Rempała, Kościecha (Fx)
 (65,30) Okoniewski, K. Jabłoński, Jeleniewski, M. Jabłoński
 (65,67) Miedziński, Ułamek, Stachyra, Cieślewicz
 (65,99) Dobrucki, Kościuch, Hlib, Drabik
 (66,00) Okoniewski, Drabik, Paluch, Cieślewicz
 (65,93) Kościuch, Ząbik, Miedziński, Jeleniewski
 (65,75) K. Jabłoński, Stachyra, Dobrucki, Rempała
 (65,99) Ułamek, Hlib, M. Jabłoński, Kościecha
 The Final:
 (66,12) Dobrucki, Okoniewski, Ułamek, K. Jabłoński

See also 
 motorcycle speedway
 2008 in sports

References

External links 
 (Polish) Official webside

Boleslaw Chrobry Tournament
Bolesław Chrobry Tournament